Purnachandra Bidika (born 4 April 1957) is a Powerlifter from Odisha who won 4 gold medals in 2006-World Power Lifting Championship. Bidika hails from an adivasi family of Rayagada, Odisha. The Chief Minister of Orissa has made a financial assistance of Rs.2 lakhs for his participation in international event.

Achievements

Other awards and achievements
 Finished 3rd in 60-kg Master-II category of World power lifting championship held in Palmspring City in USA in 2008
 Won District level Weight lifting championship in 1985 which he continued to win for consecutive 7 times 
 Won 52-kg Master Title at the National Arms Wrestling Championship in Bhilai
 Won 52-kg Master Title at the National Arms Wrestling Championship in U.P. in 2006

References

1957 births
Living people
Weightlifters from Odisha